Intellectual responsibility (also known as epistemic responsibility) is a philosophical concept related to that of epistemic justification. According to Frederick F. Schmitt, "the conception of justified belief as epistemically responsible belief has been endorsed by a number of philosophers, including Roderick Chisholm (1977), Hilary Kornblith (1983), and Lorraine Code (1983)."


Responsibility of intellectuals
A separate concept was introduced by the linguist and public intellectual Noam Chomsky in an essay published as a special supplement by The New York Review of Books on 23 February 1967, entitled "The Responsibility of Intellectuals". Chomsky argues that intellectuals should make themselves responsible for searching for the truth and the exposing of lies.

Notes

See also

External links
 The Responsibility of Intellectuals - Noam Chomsky's essay, referred to above

Concepts in epistemology
Ethical principles